Jonathan, Johnathan, Jonathon, or Jonny Taylor may refer to:

Sports
Jonathan Taylor (alpine skier) (born 1943), British alpine skier
Johnathan Taylor (born 1979), American football defensive end
Jonathon Taylor (born 1979), New Zealand footballer
Jonathan Taylor (American football) (born 1999), American football running back

Others
Jonathan Taylor (congressman) (1796–1848), American lawyer and politician, U.S. Representative from Ohio
Jonathan Taylor (Wisconsin assemblyman) (fl. 1850), American politician, member of the Wisconsin State Assembly
Jonathan Taylor (academic) (born 1935), British academic
Jonathan Taylor (author) (born 1973), British author, poet and academic
Jonny Taylor (fl. 2008), Australian Idol contestant

See also
Jonathan Taylor Thomas (born 1981), American actor
Jonathan Taylor Updegraff (1822–1882), U.S. Representative from Ohio
Jon Taylor (disambiguation)
John Taylor (disambiguation)